Julián Molina (born 24 November 1998) is a Colombian professional BMX rider who has gained recognition at the X Games. He has represented Colombia in international competitions. He competed in the time trial event and the racing event at the Sosh Urban Motion in Paris 2015.

References

External links
 Profile at Red Bull
X Games Real BMX 2021 at X Games

1998 births
Living people
BMX riders
Colombian male cyclists
Sportspeople from Antioquia Department
21st-century Colombian people